Somagudem is a census town near to Kasipet in Mancherial district (old Adilabad district) of the Indian state of Telangana.

References 

Villages in Mancherial district
Mandal headquarters in Mancherial district
Census towns in Adilabad district